Morten Ørum Madsen (born 9 April 1988) is a Danish professional golfer. He played on the European Tour from 2013 to 2016, winning the South African Open Championship in late 2013.

Early life and amateur career
Madsen was born in Silkeborg. He took up golf at the age of 12, and enjoyed a successful amateur career. He played for Denmark in the 2008 Eisenhower Trophy and again in 2010, being part of the team that took the silver medal in 2010. He attended Oregon State University from 2008 to 2011.

Professional career
Madsen  turned professional in 2011 and promptly won twice on the third-tier Nordic League, earning a place on the Challenge Tour. A consistent second season saw him earn promotion to the full European Tour for 2013. He finished 19th in the Challenge Tour rankings, but slightly improved his status with a T16 at European Tour Q School.

On 24 November 2013, he won the South African Open Championship by a margin of two strokes.

A string of poor finishes saw him lose his European Tour privileges and he eventually returned to the Nordic Golf League, where he won an event in February 2019.

Amateur wins
2008 Houborg Open, Wibroe Cup, Royal Tour 1, Royal Tour 2
2009 Danish Amateur Strokeplay

Professional wins (5)

European Tour wins (1)

1Co-sanctioned by the Sunshine Tour

Sunshine Tour wins (1)

1Co-sanctioned by the European Tour

Nordic Golf League wins (4)

Results in major championships

CUT = missed the half-way cut
"T" = tied

Team appearances
Amateur
European Amateur Team Championship (representing Denmark): 2007, 2008, 2009, 2010
Eisenhower Trophy (representing Denmark): 2008, 2010
St Andrews Trophy (representing the Continent of Europe): 2010 (winners)

See also
2012 Challenge Tour graduates
2012 European Tour Qualifying School graduates

References

External links

Danish male golfers
European Tour golfers
Oregon State Beavers men's golfers
Sportspeople from the Central Denmark Region
People from Silkeborg
1988 births
Living people